The 1932 New South Wales Rugby Football League premiership was the twenty-fifth season of Sydney’s top-level rugby league competition, Australia’s first. During the season, which lasted from April until September, eight teams from across the city contested the premiership, culminating in South Sydney’s victory over Western Suburbs in the final.

Teams
 Balmain, formed on January 23, 1908, at Balmain Town Hall
 Eastern Suburbs, formed on January 24, 1908, at Paddington Town Hall
 Newtown, formed on January 14, 1908
 North Sydney, formed on February 7, 1908
 South Sydney, formed on January 17, 1908, at Redfern Town Hall
 St. George, formed on November 8, 1920, at Kogarah School of Arts
 Western Suburbs, formed on February 4, 1908
 University, formed in 1919 at Sydney University

Ladder

Finals
In the two semi finals, the top two ranked teams South Sydney and Western Suburbs beat their lower-ranked opponents Eastern Suburbs and Balmain, respectively. The two winners then played in a final in which favourites and minor premiers South Sydney were beaten by Western Suburbs. However the finals system set in place then forced the final to be replayed, in what was known as the "Right of Challenge". This system ensured that in the event that the minor premiers lost in either the first or second round of the finals, then they would be given a second chance no matter what in what would later become the final premiership decider.

Grand Final

In the Grand Final, South Sydney beat Western Suburbs 19–12 to take away their seventh premiership in eight years.

The match was played on Saturday, 24 September, 1932 at the Sydney Sports Ground and refereed by Lal Deane before a crowd of 16,925. It was a titanic battle in which Souths led 9–2 at half-time before Wests fought back to level at 12–12. Minutes from full-time a towering penalty goal by Benny Wearing edged Souths ahead 14–12 before they closed out the game with a converted try by Eric Lewis.

The Whiticker/Collis reference quotes a rather prosaic Labor Daily in praise of both sides: “The ebb and flow of the grand final thrilled thousands who saw a great battle. A battle of the gladiators, fighting till their lungs seemed only fit to burst, while over 16,000 people hearts beating wildly to the thump of running feet, looked on gasping, cheering and rising from their seats in sheer delight”.

South Sydney 19 (Tries: Jack Why, Alby Black, Eric Lewis. Goals: Benny Wearing 4, Percy Williams)

Western Suburbs 12 (Tries: Alan Ridley, Harry Rankine. Goals: Les Mead 3)

References

External links
 Whiticker, Alan  & Collis, Ian (2006) The History of Rugby League Clubs, New Holland, Sydney
 Rugby League Tables - Notes The World of Rugby League
 Rugby League Tables - Season 1932 AFL Tables
 Premiership History and Statistics RL1908
 

New South Wales Rugby League premiership
NSWRFL season